The AEC Regent I was a double-decker bus chassis manufactured by AEC.

History
The AEC Regent I was a bus chassis introduced by AEC in 1929. Twelve pre-production examples had been completed by July 1929, with mainstream production commencing in October 1929. It was succeeded by the AEC Regent II in 1942.

Survivors
Birmingham City Transport 486 at the Transport Museum Wythall
Thomas Tilling 922 at the London Bus Museum

References

Further reading

Regent I
Vehicles introduced in 1929